Vivian Whitta Wilson (6 January 1899 – 14 October 1978) was a New Zealand rugby union player. He played seven matches for the All Blacks but did not appear in any internationals.

References

1899 births
1978 deaths
Rugby union players from Auckland
People educated at Auckland Grammar School
New Zealand rugby union players
New Zealand international rugby union players
Auckland rugby union players
Bay of Plenty rugby union players
Rugby union centres